Duffinselache (Duffin's shark) is an extinct genus of basal selachimorph elasmobranchii cartilaginous fish known from the Late Triassic (Rhaetian stage) of England. It was first named by Duffin in 1998 as a species of Polyacrodus. Plamen S. Andreev and Gilles Cuny in 2012 reassigned to its own genus, and its type species is Duffinselache holwellensis.

References

Fossil taxa described in 2012
Triassic fish of Europe
Triassic sharks